The Shri Mata Vaishno Devi University,श्री माता वैष्णो देवी विश्वविद्यालय commonly referred to as SMVD University or SMVDU, is a State Public University recognized by UGC under section 2(f) and 12(B) and is established on an  residential and provides technical education in the field of engineering, science, management, philosophy and other subjects of contemporary importance, with all technical courses recognised by AICTE,University Grants Commission (India) and Council of Architecture. 

Shri Mata Vaishno Devi University was ranked in the 100-150 category by the National Institutional Ranking Framework (NIRF) university ranking in 2020. The College of Engineering was ranked 78 by the NIRF engineering ranking in 2020. SMVDU is ranked 80th globally and 3rd within India in the Times Higher Education Impact Ranking 2021 under the UNSDG category 07. SMVDU is also ranked in the 6th-25th Rank band in the government aided institutions categoryin the Atal Ranking of Institutions on Innovation achievements ARIIA 2020 Ranking of government of India.

It is a self-contained township with most facilities available in-house.

History

Back in 1998 the people of Jammu region supported the establishment of Shri Mata vaishno Devi University. This turned into movement which lasted for around two months. Various students, traders, lawyers and various communities joined this movement. Even a 17-day-long strike was observed for the cause. Ultimately Jammu and Kashmir state government had to give in and State Legislature enacted SMVDU's act of 1999 which made it a technical and fully residential university.

SMVDU got established as an Institute under State Legislature Act of the J&K Legislature under its Act of 1999 which defines it as a technical and fully residential university. Shri Mata Vaishno Devi Shrine Board owned and Funded the project for construction of university. Hence site spread over an area of 470 acres was procured from Kakryal village, a flat hill across Jhajjar stream from National Highway 1A (now NH44).

Shri Mata Vaishno Devi University (SMVDU) has been established under THE JAMMU AND KASHMIR SHRI MATA VAISHNO DEVI UNIVERSITY ACT, 1999, an act of the J&K State Legislature (ACT No. XII of 1999 dated 12 May 1999) as an autonomous,  highly Technical & fully Residential University.

N. K. Bansal took over as the Vice-Chancellor, after the establishment of the university in 2004 and served until 2009. He started various programs in the discipline of Science, Management, Renewable Energy, Humanities and Social Science.

Campus
University is in the proximity of the Trikuta foothills. The  University campus is divided into various blocks such as the Academic Block, Administrative Block, Central Library, Hostels & Residential Area. The various schools of study consist of well equipped, lecture and seminar halls, conference rooms, departmental lab and computer lab and all modern facilities.

The Initial campus plan was Designed and Master planned by S.Ghosh & Associates. They were awarded this project through by Winning a national level competition entry. The basic plan got implemented and it was completed by 2006.

Organization and administration

Funding
The university receives funding from Shri Mata Vaishno Devi Shrine Board, an autonomous Board set up in August 1986 under the provisions of The Jammu and Kashmir Shri Mata Vaishno Devi Shrine Act, 1986 of J&K State Legislature.  The university also gets funds from UGC (University Grants Commission).

Governance
Lieutenant Governor of Jammu and Kashmir is nominal Chancellor of the university and the Chairman of the Shri Mata Vaishno Devi Shrine Board.

The Executive Council of the university, with Vice-Chancellor as its head, is the supreme body of the university.  The Academic Council is the highest academic body and makes recommendations to the Executive Council on academic matters.  The university also has a Finance Committee and the Building & Works Committee.  The Planning Board helps the Vice-Chancellor in foreseeing the growth of the university.

Faculties 
There are four colleges or faculties, with a Dean heading each one of them. Each college consists of Schools of Study, analogous to departments in a university, headed by a Director. Academic de-centralization allows each school to function in an autonomous manner.

The Schools offer various programs of Study at undergraduate, Post-graduate and Doctorate level.

The university has adopted an IIT/UGC pattern of Study with Choice-based credit system and continuous evaluation based on Grade Point Average (GPA) on a 10-point scale.

Faculty of Engineering
 School of Architecture and Landscape Design
 School of Computer Science Engineering
 School of Mechanical Engineering
 School of Electronics and Communication Engineering
 School of Electrical Engineering
 School of Civil Engineering
 School of Energy Management

Faculty of Management
The College of Management consists of the following schools:
 School of Business
 School of Economics

Faculty of Sciences
The College of Sciences consists of the following schools:
 School of Mathematics
 School of Physics
 School of Biotechnology

Faculty of Humanities & Social Science
The Faculty of Humanities & Social Sciences consists of the following Departments:
 Department of Philosophy & Culture
 Department of Languages & Literature

Academics

Recognition
The university is approved by UGC under Section 2(F) & Section 12(B) of UGC Act of 1956.

The technical programs of the university are recognized by AICTE (All India Council of Technical Education) while Architecture program is recognized by Council of Architecture.

University Grants Commission recognises it under section 2(f). First convocation was held in 2008 which got delivered by Hon’ble Prime Minister Dr. Manmohan Singh. In 2009, UGC granted 12(b) status to the university and it started to get grants from it.

Admissions
Many students are admitted into the BTech / BArch programme every year from amongst the high rankers of JEE (Main) through the Central Seat Allocation Board (MHRD).

Candidates admitted to M.B.A. programme pass through a three tier selection process based on CAT/MAT Score, Group Discussions & Interviews conducted by panel of academicians from IITs & corporate professionals. Only the selected candidates make it through.

Admissions to other Post-Graduate Programmes (MSc, Five Years Integrated MSc Economics, MTech, MCA, M. A.) & PhD are made through National level Entrance Tests & Interviews.

Unlike most of the colleges in India, SMVDU has no reservation quota for certain section of students and the students are allotted seats solely on the basis of their merit.

Academic programmes 
The university follows the Credit-based programme structure which requires students to earn sufficient credits for degree. Industrial/Corporate Training is also mandatory part of curriculum. Students are encouraged to work on industry sponsored projects. Continuous Evaluation System is followed and Evaluation techniques including Quiz, Assignments, Minor & Major Tests are used periodically. Each school has a Board of Studies consisting of eminent academicians and professionals from industry who update the syllabi to ensure relevance of the content viz a viz the needs of industry as well as Research.

Extensive usage of varied contemporary pedagogy like Multi-media teaching aids including Digital Projectors, OHP, Net Enabled Labs, Video Conferencing, Cut Section Models, Simulation Software are used to enrich the teaching-learning process. Field visits are conducted regularly to familiarise students with real world applications of the knowledge learnt.

Visiting Lectures by a variety of faculty members and professionals are arranged on a regular basis to broaden the scope of learning. The university has an excellent Student Teacher Ratio of 12:1, ensuring sufficient faculty access to the students.

Rankings

Shri Mata Vaishno Devi University was ranked in the 100-150 category by the National Institutional Ranking Framework (NIRF) university ranking in 2020. 
The College of Engineering was ranked 78 by the NIRF engineering ranking in 2020.
School of Architecture was ranked in the 76-100 category by the NIRF university ranking 2020.

Student Assistantship Program
Top ten percent of students in each class are awarded scholarship with tuition fee waiver ranging from 100% to 50% subject to fulfillment of merit restrictions.

Outreach
The university has entered into collaboration with Institutions of eminence in India & abroad including IIT Delhi,Panjab University,Baba Saheb Bhimrao Ambedkar University,Lucknow IIIM, Kurukshetra University, Thapar University, Aachen University Germany, Kun-Shan University Taiwan to enhance faculty-student exchange and co-operate in Research activities.  The university has recently started hosting the British Council Higher Education Center for convenience of students.  The university is among the few institutions in the country which host the Counseling Center of AIEEE-CCB.

Research

Labs and library
The university has over 35 laboratories. Each school has its own reference library besides the University Central Library, which contains more than 50,000 books. Virtual Digital Library facility is also available and it is opening for all students. The university has access to more academic journals through AICTE-INDEST consortium.

Research Centres
UGC has funded following Research Centres established by the university to pursue active research resulting in patents, products & publications:
 Center for Embedded Instrumentation & Networked Controls
 Center of Excellence in Biotechnology
 Center for Advanced Manufacturing
 Center for Energy Management & Water Resource
 Center of Excellence for Entrepreneurial Development

Student life

Student hostels
The university has a residential system which can accommodate all the students on campus in six hostels (Vidhyanchal, Nilgiri, Trikuta, Kailash and Basoli for men, and Shivalik and Vaishnavi for women).

College festivals
Following are the major festivals in the annual calendar:
Titiksha, the annual national level technical festival
 Tatva, management festival 
 Srijan, an architecture festival
 Resurgence, annual cultural & sports festival
 Lit-Life, annual literature festival, held by the Department of Languages and Literature
 Artha, Economics festival

Besides festivals, international conferences, Annual Science Day, Annual Engineers Day, monthly panel discussions "Mind-meet", and open source technology meetups are held regularly.

In March 2010, the university hosted the Zonal NASA Convention with 750 students of architecture from North-Indian architecture institutions.

Community development
Students have established a unique program "Vikalp", under which under-privileged children of nearby community are taught and trained regularly. The children under this program are given free medications from university health care center.

Controversies

Land controversy
It is believed that the land acquired by the university was not acquired in accordance with the law. But later the culprits were found in the State Revenue Department and the allegation on the university was proven to be false.

See also
School of Architecture & Landscape Design, Shri Mata Vaishno Devi University

References

External links

 

All India Council for Technical Education
Engineering colleges in Jammu and Kashmir
Universities in Jammu and Kashmir